Cazê (Chinese: 查孜; Pinyin: Cházī) is a township in Ngamring County, Tibet Autonomous Region of China. It lies at an altitude of 4,787 metres (15,708 feet).

See also
List of towns and villages in Tibet

Notes

Populated places in Shigatse
Township-level divisions of Tibet